Detonics is an American firearm manufacturing company founded around 1976, which has existed under several owners and variants of this name. Detonics is best known for its innovative design of compact self-loading pistols, such as the Pocket 9 and the 1911-style Combat Master.

Iterations
~1976-1987: Detonics Manufacturing Company (Seattle, Washington)
1987-1992: New Detonics (Arizona)
2004-2007: Detonics USA (Georgia)

Gallery

References

 "The History of Detonics". Accessed July 2, 2012
The Detonics Story. Rick Brenemen, Sightm1911.com
 Rauch, Walt. "Detonics Combat Master". Handguns Magazine, December 13, 2005.

External links

Companies based in St. Clair County, Illinois
American companies established in 2007
Firearm manufacturers of the United States
Manufacturing companies based in Illinois
Manufacturing companies established in 2007